Goose Pond Reservation is a  nature preserve in Lee, Massachusetts and is managed by the Trustees of Reservations as a wilderness area.  There are no trails around the shoreline as it is much too rocky, but the area can be accessed by boat from the nearby boat ramp.  The reservation is adjacent to National Park Service land and is crossed by the Appalachian Trail.

The reservation was established in 1986.

References

External links 
 The Trustees of Reservations: Goose Pond Reservation

The Trustees of Reservations
Open space reserves of Massachusetts
Protected areas of Berkshire County, Massachusetts
Protected areas established in 1986
1986 establishments in Massachusetts